Pepi Erben (born 18 January 1928) is a German alpine skier. He competed in two events at the 1952 Winter Olympics, finishing 47th. During the competition, he broke his leg and required medical attention. He later became a coach for Iceland and Morocco.

References

External links
 

1928 births
Living people
People from Trutnov District
Sudeten German people
German male alpine skiers
Olympic alpine skiers of Germany
Alpine skiers at the 1952 Winter Olympics
20th-century German people